Frederic William Harmer FGS, FRMetS (24 April 1835 – 24 April 1923) was an English amateur geologist, palaeontologist, and naturalist.

He was born in Norwich and was educated at Norwich Grammar School.

Harmer was the mayor of Norwich in 1887–1888 and served there as an alderman from 1880 to 1902. After about a decade of inactivity in geological work, he presented in 1895 at the meeting of the British Association at Ipswich two important papers on the Coralline and Red Crags. From 1895 until his death, he actively pursued field work in geology. He was awarded the Murchison Medal in 1902.

He made extensive investigations of the Pliocene and Pleistocene deposits in England's eastern and midland counties, as well as those deposits in Belgium and the Netherlands. The Société géologique de Belgique elected him an honorary member. The University of Cambridge conferred upon him an honorary M.A.

He married Mary Young Lyon in 1860. The marriage produced several children, among whom were the surgeon William Douglas Harmer and the zoologist Sir Sidney Frederic Harmer.

References

External links
 

1835 births
1923 deaths
English geologists
Geologists from Norwich